The Karad Caves form a group of 66 Buddhist caves located about 5 kilometers south west of Karad, near the village Jakhinwadi overlooking the Koyna River. They are composed of:
 Agashiv Caves 
 Bhairav Caves 
 Dongrai Caves ) 

The caves are located on Agashiv hill and some caves are scattered around Jakhinwadi.
The caves facing south are important caves. There are caves in the valley as well. One of the caves is named after Chokhamela who lived there for about 8 years.

These caves are carved in first century BC and are very simple.

Cave 5 - have earliest Buddhist symbols
Cave 30- Buddhist symbols

The inscription describes the gift by Sanghmitra, Son of Gopala.

References

External links

 Exploration at Karad

Buddhist caves in India
Caves of Maharashtra
Indian rock-cut architecture
Former populated places in India
Buddhist pilgrimage sites in India
Buddhist monasteries in India
Caves containing pictograms in India